Karl Roomet (2 September 1902 Tartu County – July 1941 Vaimastvere Parish, Tartu County) was an Estonian politician. He was a member of VI Riigikogu (its Chamber of Deputies).

References

1902 births
1941 deaths
Members of the Riigivolikogu
Estonian people who died in Soviet detention